Baldassare Cenci may refer to:

Baldassare Cenci (seniore) (1648–1709), Italian Roman Catholic cardinal
Baldassare Cenci (iuniore) (1710–1763), Italian Roman Catholic cardinal